Belur is a neighbourhood in northern part of Howrah city in Howrah district, West Bengal, India. It is a part of the area covered by Kolkata Metropolitan Development Authority (KMDA). The area is best known for Belur Math, a religious monastery containing a complex of temples. Belur Math is famous for being the headquarters of the Ramakrishna Math, a monastic order, as well as that of the related Ramakrishna Mission, both founded by Swami Vivekananda. On the opposite side of the Hooghly River, opposite to Belur Math is the Dakshineswar Kali Temple.

Belur is under the jurisdiction of Belur Police Station and Bally Police Station of Howrah City Police.

Location
Belur is situated on the west bank of Hooghly River. It is located between Liluah and Bally.

Recreation
Rangoli Mall in Belur (on Girish Ghosh Road) has a gross leasable area of 3.5 lakh square feet. It was opened in 2015 and houses stores of premium brands, including Max Lifestyle, Domino's Pizza, Archies and Spencer's retail among others. There is INOX multiplex also in the mall.

Transport
State Highway 6/Grand Trunk Road passes through the west side of Belur. Girish Ghosh Road runs along the eastern part of Belur. Some Private Buses (51, 54 and 56), Minibuses (Bally Khal-Khidirpur and Belur Math-Esplanade) and CSTC Buses (S32A on Belgharia-Howrah Station and AC50 on Belur Math-Garia) serve the neighbourhood.

Belur is linked to Howrah Station via Belur railway station and Belur Math railway station.

See also
Swami Vivekananda
Ramakrishna Paramhansa
Hooghly River
Liluah

References

Cities and towns in Howrah district
Neighbourhoods in Howrah
Neighbourhoods in Kolkata
Kolkata Metropolitan Area
Tourism in West Bengal